Gone Dead Train: The Best of Crazy Horse 1971–1989 is a 2005 compilation album released by Crazy Horse.

Track listing
"Gone Dead Train" (Nitzsche, Titelman) - 4:09
"Dance, Dance, Dance" (Young) - 2:13
"Beggars Day" (Lofgren) - 4:31
"I Don't Want to Talk About It" (Whitten) - 5:20
"Downtown" (Whitten, Young) - 3:16
"Rock and Roll Band" (Jordan) - 3:11
"Don't Keep Me Burning" (Curtis) - 4:14
"Lady Soul" (Curtis) - 3:35
"Don't Look Back" (Curtis) - 3:28
"She's Hot" (Antoine, Sampedro) - 3:11
"Downhill" (Sampedro) - 4:13
"End of the Line" (Molina) - 3:01
"Going Down Again" (Molina) - 3:25
"Thunder and Lightning" (Sampedro, Talbot) - 3:59
"Left for Dead" (Mone) - 4:20
"Child of War" (Mone) - 3:35
"World of Love" (Mone) - 4:29
"Pill's Blues" (Whitsell) - 4:02
"Let Me Go" (Whitten) - 3:47

References

Raven Records compilation albums
2005 greatest hits albums
Crazy Horse (band) albums